Several Russian and Soviet warships were named Admiral Ushakov (Адмирал Ушаков) in honour of Fyodor Fyodorovich Ushakov:

 , lead ship of her class of coastal battleships; sunk at the Battle of Tsushima in 1905
 , formerly named Kirov, lead ship of her class of nuclear powered missile cruisers

Russian Navy ship names